Nové Mesto nad Váhom is a town in the Trenčín Region of Slovakia.

Geography
District town located at the northern edge of the Danubian Hills at the foothills of the northern end of the White Carpathians, on the Váh river. Other mountains nearby are the White Carpathian and the Považský Inovec. It is situated 27 km from Trenčín and 100 km from Bratislava and has an area of 32.583 km2.
The Town parts are: Mnešice, Izbice, Javorinaská, Hájovky, Samoty, Luka, Centrum, Rajková (northern city), Záhumenice.

Places of interest
 Zelená voda Lakes 1 km - watersports, windsurfing, fishing, sports centre, camping area, disco and music festival place
 Čachtice Castle 6 km - home of Elizabeth Báthory
 Beckov Castle 5 km
 Tematin Castle 12 km
 the most famous Slovak Spa town Piešťany 18 km
 Trenčín 22 km
 Veľká Javorina Mountain (SK-CZ border) 15 km
 Ski Resort Kálnica 7 km
 Ducové - the Great Moravian Empire settlement 16 km
 Romanesque church in Haluzice 12 km

History
Lands in the place of today's Nové Mesto nad Váhom were inhabited in the prehistoric ages, as many artefacts from the Stone and Bronze Ages were discovered. In the local part Mnešice a prehistoric settlement was discovered.

The first written record about Nové Mesto nad Váhom was in 1263, when King Béla IV of Hungary granted freedoms for the loyalty during the Mongol invasions. It belonged to the Benedictine order, later to Matthew III Csák and others. It received its town privileges in 1550. Industry developed in the 19th century and was mainly focused at processing agricultural products.

Sport
Slovak Bandy Association has organised rink bandy practice in Nové Mesto nad Váhom.

Monuments
 Fortified Roman-Reneissance-Baroque Church of the Nativity of the Virgin Mary
 Renaissance Vicariage Palace
 Renaissance church fortification
 Renaissance-Baroque Ghillanys' Palace (17th Century)
 Renaissance Nadasdys' Palace (16th Century)
 Protestant Church (1787)
 St. Ondrej Church (1643)
 Baroque Chapel in Hurbanova St. (18th Century)
 Baroque St. Rochus Chapel (18th Century)
 Plague Memorial on the main square (1696)
 St. Florian Statue (1762)

Demographics
According to the 2001 census, the town had 21,327 inhabitants. 
98.1% of inhabitants were Slovaks, 
1.1% Czechs 
0.6% Roma. The religious make-up was 56% Roman Catholics, 23.3% people with no religious affiliation, and 13.8% Lutherans.

Transport
 Railway - the town lies on the most important trans-Slovak railway track Bratislava - Kosice and a local railway branch connects Nové Mesto nad Váhom with Veselí na Moravě in the Czech Republic; express trains stop at Nové Mesto nad Váhom Station. Fast trains Bratislava-Kosice route every one to two hours, regional trains to Bratislava, Žilina, Veselí na Moravě approximately ten times a day. Arriva Express Train connects the town with Prague and Nitra daily. 
 Road - main motorway D1 Bratislava - Zilina, local roads to Piešťany Spa, Trenčín, Stará Turá, Strání (SK-CZ state border)
 Public transport in the town - blue local busses stop at all the stops in the town area; the town public transport bus service RED BUS line 1 (Hajovky-Centrum-Railway station/Bus station - Industrial zone/MILEX) and line 2 (Railway station/Bus station - Centrum - Mnešice)
 Buses - blue local buses "SAD" join the town with all the villages within the district; the bus station is just right at the train station about 10 mins walk from the town centre; long-haul bus services join the town with all the important towns in Slovakia and Czech Republic
 Airport - the nearest airport Piešťany Airport (PZY) no scheduled flights; scheduled flights from Bratislava M.R. Stefanik Airport (BTS) (100 km southwest, 55min. drive by motorway D1)
 Taxi service - taxi stand at railway and bus station

Notable people
 Stibor of Stiboricz (ca. 1348–1414) and his wife the Dutchess Dobrochna
 the Duke Ctibor II.
 David ben Menachem Mandel Deutsch (1760–1830), rabbi, Talmudist
 , born Ignacz Einhorn (1825–1875), a Hungarian Jewish economist, politician
 Leopold Donath (1845–1876), rabbi
 Salomon Stricker (1834–1898), Jewish pathologist
 Ernest Nagel (1901–1985), philosopher of science
 Jela Špitková (born 1947); (de)
 Anička Jurkovičová, the first Slovak actress
 Jakub Haško
 Ľudmila Podjavorinská
 Peter Matejka, artist, painter
 Markovič brothers, politicians
 Dominik Štubňa Zámostský, novelist
 Béli Vörös Ernest (Béli Vörös Ernő) (1882–1922), Hungarian painter

Twin towns — sister cities

Nové Mesto nad Váhom is twinned with:
 Uherský Brod, Czech Republic

References

External links

  
 Nové Mesto nad Váhom - Information website also about tourism
 Museum N.Mesto n.V.
 Virtual Travel 3D panorama Nove Mesto nad Vahom

Cities and towns in Slovakia
Shtetls